Berik Abdrakhmanov (born 20 June 1986) is a Kazakhstani amateur boxer in the lightweight division who competed at the 2013 World Championships, won the Bronze medal along with Domenico Valentino of Italy.

References

1986 births
Living people
Lightweight boxers
Boxers at the 2014 Asian Games
Kazakhstani male boxers
AIBA World Boxing Championships medalists
Olympic boxers of Kazakhstan
Boxers at the 2016 Summer Olympics
Asian Games competitors for Kazakhstan
21st-century Kazakhstani people